Downwell is a video game that is a combination of a vertically scrolling shooter and platform game with elements of a roguelike. It was developed by Ojiro Fumoto and published by Devolver Digital for iOS and Microsoft Windows in October 2015, for Android in January 2016, and for PlayStation 4 and PlayStation Vita in May 2016. A Nintendo Switch version was released in January 2019. British studio Red Phantom Games developed the Switch and PlayStation ports.

Downwell uses a palette of four colors, which default to black background and white outlines, with red as a highlight for gems, enemies and other important items, and blue for water environment features. The exact colors can be changed through unlockable in-game palettes. The art style and underground level design have been compared to Spelunky and Cave Story.

Gameplay 

In Downwell, players control a "curious man" named Welltaro, who is at the local park one night when he decides to explore the depths of the well nearby. Knowing that monsters are waiting for him inside, he straps on his gunboots and starts his trip downwards, killing his enemies to proceed and collect treasure. The game has three basic controls: left and right movement, and the ability to jump while on a solid surface. When mid-air, pressing and holding the jump button fires from Welltaro's gunboots.

The well is procedurally generated, and the player is often confronted with a large number of different types of enemies, most of which can either be shot with the gunboots or stomped by jumping on them; others, however, are resistant to being stomped and can thus only be killed with bullets. While normal enemies only feature a red glare alongside the white outlines, these particular enemies are completely highlighted in red, with a more filled sprite body. The gunboots are automatically reloaded when Welltaro hits a surface, regardless of whether or not it is solid. During the descent, players will find "timevoids", which, upon entering, stop everything outside them, as well as the music. These timevoids may lead to caves, which provide the player with a large amount of gems, or with an alternate weapon, which influences speed, delay, ammo usage, ammo count and the shoot pattern of the gunboots, as well as providing either health or a max ammo upgrade. In other cases, the timevoids lead to a shop, where Welltaro is welcomed by a Jizō, who is taking the place of a shopkeeper, offering the player three different items in exchange for gems.

The well is built up from multiple stages, each of them having three levels and featuring different sets of environmental designs and enemies. At the end of each level, the player is given the choice between three Welltaro upgrades, which persist throughout the play session and support the player, in addition to ammo upgrades or shop purchases. Additionally, alternating with color palettes unlocks, the player unlocks different movement styles, which influence Welltaro's position and movement animation while on solid ground, as well as some of the well's procedural attributes, like frequency and type of timevoids.

Development 
Downwell development began around March 2014. At that time, Fumoto had graduated in opera singing at the Tokyo University of the Arts, but felt like that was not the way he wanted to go in life. So, at the end of February 2014, Fumoto canceled his studies and went on to make multiple "game-a-week" projects, after he read about that idea in Rami Ismail's article on Gamasutra. Downwell was Fumoto's thirteenth project, in which he instantly saw a high potential and decided to continue its development. Much of the game was influenced with Fumoto's obsession with Spelunky, and the initial idea for the game came from him wondering what a mobile phone game with similar gameplay would be like. In early development the gameplay was that of a standard platform game, however once Fumoto came up with the Gunshoe mechanic he rebuilt the game around it. During early development, the game was titled Fall or Well, however, during an indie meet-up in Tokyo, Japan, Fumoto figured that he needed an actual name for his game, and therefore came up with Downwell, and stuck with it. While the game was not very popular at the time, Fumoto started posting animated GIF images of Downwell gameplay in early development stages on his Japanese Twitter account, which came to the attention of Cara Ellison from The Guardian, as the game was largely different from Japan's usual indie gaming market. On the same day of the article being published, indie publisher Devolver Digital hooked up with Fumoto through a comment on one of his GIF images, which showed the player shooting monsters and crates together with the "drone" upgrade, which repeats the actions the player takes. This comment and the following dialog then led to Devolver Digital becoming Downwell publisher. With constant support from Devolver Digital and Fumoto's continuous posting of GIF images led to the opening of the game's official website and the announcement for the late 2015 release on iOS and Microsoft Windows.

The game was shown at gaming conventions, one of which was the Independent Games Festival 2015, which was held from 2 March 2015 to 6 March 2015, at which Downwell got to the finalists of the "Student Showcase Award". Another important convention was Japan's largest indie games festival, BitSummit 2015, which was held from 11 July 2015 to 12 July 2015, and at which Downwell was nominated for the Vermillion Gate Award by the Grand Jury and scored second behind La-Mulana 2. The game was finally announced for a release on 15 October 2015 and was released for iOS and Microsoft Windows, while Moppin continued working on the Android version. On 12 November 2015, Downwell was nominated for "Best Mobile/Handheld Game" for The Game Awards 2015, which took place on 3 December 2015. On 11 December 2015, publisher Devolver Digital teased Downwell for future release on PlayStation Vita by sharing a picture showing the game running on a PlayStation Vita device with tate mode enabled. On 26 January 2016, it was announced that Downwell would be released the following day, respectively, 27 January 2016. On 9 February 2016, an official video by Sony Computer Entertainment revealed that the game would be released for PlayStation 4 and PlayStation Vita sometime in 2016.

Fumoto announced in January 2018 that he had started working for Nintendo, saying "I'll do my best". It is believed that his success with Downwell was a large factor in his hiring. Fumoto previously stated that "[i]t was super fun developing games as indie" and that he "[could not] wait to see what it's like to develop games as part of a bigger team." In September 2018, during that month's Nintendo Direct show, it was announced that Red Phantom Games was developing a port of Downwell for the Nintendo Switch. At the beginning of 2019, Fumoto announced he had quit his job at Nintendo and returned to indie development.

Reception 

Upon release, Downwell received critical acclaim. On Metacritic, the game currently holds a score of 81/100 for Microsoft Windows, 91/100 for iOS, 80/100 for PlayStation 4, and 85/100 for PlayStation Vita. Steven Hansen from Destructoid praised the game's design concept and giving it a perfect 10/10 by saying that "[t]hese are the kind of things you learn as you delve deeper and deeper into Downwell's four worlds (three levels each) and they are presented intelligently." Another positive review was written by Nadia Oxford from Gamezebo, who gave the game a 5 out of 5 stars ranking and praising Downwell overall play-style and design, stating that "Downwell is easily one of the best action games to hit mobile this year. It’s intense, it’s unique, and every game you play goes towards unlocking something new." Peter Bathge from German PC gaming magazine PC Games, however, gave the game a 70% score, criticizing that "[the game] feels somehow weird on the PC. This does not only come from the not always perfect, fixed and predefined controls, but the whole game principle is obviously cut to the mobile market needs."

Awards

References

External links 
 

2015 video games
Android (operating system) games
Devolver Digital games
GameMaker Studio games
IOS games
Nintendo Switch games
Platform games
PlayStation 4 games
PlayStation Network games
PlayStation Vita games
Retro-style video games
Roguelike video games
Single-player video games
Vertically scrolling shooters
Video games developed in Japan
Video games using procedural generation
Windows games